Marys River is a tributary of the Mississippi River in Illinois. It drains a small watershed between the Big Muddy River and the Kaskaskia River. It joins the Mississippi just southeast of Chester, near Kaskaskia. Because of its proximity to Kaskaskia — the capital of Illinois Territory and the first capital of the State of Illinois — Marys River was the site of early settlements leading into the interior of Illinois.

Cities and counties
The following cities and towns are in the Marys River basin:
Steeleville
Sparta

Parts of the following counties are in the Mary's River basin:
Jackson County
Perry County
Randolph County

See also
List of Illinois rivers

References

External links
USGS Real-Time Stream Gage, Marys River
Prairie Rivers Network

Rivers of Illinois
Tributaries of the Mississippi River
Rivers of Randolph County, Illinois